Suitsupply is a Dutch men's suit and fashion brand founded in 2000 by Fokke de Jong in Amsterdam. Suitsupply is a vertically integrated company. Suitsupply is a member of the Fair Wear Foundation (FWF) and uses fabrics sourced from Italian mills including Vitale Barberis Canonico and Reda. Its suits are made in China.

History
Fokke de Jong ran the company from his dorm room in 2000. Currently, he is the CEO of the privately held company. Suitsupply's first store outside the Netherlands opened in Antwerp in 2007, and in the same year, a store was opened on Vigo Street, London.

Suitsupply's headquarters are located in Amsterdam; they also have offices in New York City, Dallas, and Shanghai. Suitsupply has an online store and brick-and-mortar stores in countries including Australia, Belarus, Denmark, Estonia, China, Finland, the Netherlands, Belgium, Germany, Italy, Latvia, Lithuania, Mexico, United Kingdom, Canada, Russia, Singapore, Spain, Sweden, Switzerland, France, and the United States. 

In 2020, the turnover decreased by 39% to 205 million euros (compared to 336 million euros in 2019) and incurred a loss of 109.7 million euros (compared to 1.8 million euros loss in 2019). In their own words, "this decrease was caused due to the closure of the shops and the cancellation of parties as a result of the ongoing corona crisis."

Awards and honors
Suitsupply was named among the best suits in New York City by New York Magazine in 2012, and among the best new menswear stores by GQ Magazine in 2011.  The Wall Street Journal reported in 2011 that a Giorgio Armani suit priced at $3,625 matched the quality of a Suitsupply suit priced at $614.
Fashion industry insider Tim Gunn named Suitsupply's "impeccable and affordable" suits on a list of '12 things he can't live without' in an interview for Elle Decor.

Marketing campaigns
Suitsupply is known for its sexually-charged photography and ad campaigns. Carli Hermes has been shooting all the Suitsupply campaigns since 2004. Some photos from the Shameless campaign had to be removed from a London Suitsupply shop, and images from the same campaign at Westfield London were criticized because they were displayed where they can be easily seen by children.

According to a ruling by the Belgian advertising standards authority, several photos from the Shameless campaign had to be removed from Suitsupply's website and Facebook page for portraying the female model as a sex object or as submissive to the male model.

The Ambition and Not Dressing Women campaigns also courted controversy. For the 2012 Fall/Winter look-book campaign the Lunch atop a Skyscraper photograph shot by Charles Ebbets was a source of inspiration and the images were shot against the skyline of New York City.

The spring/summer 2016 campaign, titled Toy Boys, depicted doll-size men in suits playing on giant female bodies; scenes included: men sliding down a model's bare chest, straddling a woman's neck, standing on a woman and spraying a hose into her mouth, etc. The images provoked controversy on social media.

Collaborations
Suitsupply is the official supplier of the Dutch Olympic team and was named the best Olympic opening ceremony outfit in the 2012 London Olympics by Yahoo Sports. Suitsupply dressed Dutch Olympic athletes for Beijing 2008, Vancouver 2010, London 2012, and Rio 2016.

In 2009 Suitsupply's collection featured pocket squares made of Liberty of London fabrics. Suitsupply collaborated with UNIS on a capsule collection in 2010, as well as with Mackentosh and Lavenham. Suitsupply collaborated with Antonio Maurizi, an Italian shoemaker, for a capsule collection of six shoes in 2012.

References 

Clothing brands of the Netherlands
2000 establishments in the Netherlands
2000s fashion
2010s fashion
Suit makers